Marinobacter salinus is a Gram-negative, aerobic, halophilic, rod-shaped and motile bacterium from the genus of Marinobacter which has been isolated from tidal flat on Korea.

References

External links
Type strain of Marinobacter salinus at BacDive -  the Bacterial Diversity Metadatabase

Alteromonadales
Bacteria described in 2017